Kiyoko Miki (8 April 1919 – 26 October 2018) was a Japanese politician. She was one of the first group of women elected to the House of Representatives in 1946.

Biography
Born in Osaka, Miki attended Osaka Municipal High School for Housekeepers and subsequently ran a café and apartment block. She married during World War II, but divorced shortly afterwards.

Miki contested the 1946 general elections, the first in which women could vote, as a Minponto (People's Party) candidate in Osaka 1st district, and was elected to the House of Representatives, becoming its youngest female member. However, after being elected, she was charged with falsifying her educational records on her nomination form, having claimed to have attended Osaka Prefectural Women's College. She was sentenced to two months in jail and later expelled from the House of Representatives. During her time in parliament she also began a relationship with fellow MP , announcing in December 1946 that they would marry after Kawaishi divorced his wife. However, his wife refused the divorce. Miki subsequently ran unsuccessfully as a Liberal Party candidate in the 1947 elections and as a Democratic Liberal Party candidate in the 1949 elections.

She later married a reporter from Asahi Shimbun and lived in Takarazuka. She died in 2018.

References

1919 births
People from Osaka
Japanese businesspeople
20th-century Japanese women politicians
20th-century Japanese politicians
Liberal Party (Japan, 1945) politicians
Democratic Liberal Party (Japan) politicians
Members of the House of Representatives (Japan)
2018 deaths